Las Piedras is a town and sea port in northwestern Venezuela, in the Punto Fijo metropolitan area.

Transportation 
Punto Fijo metropolitan area is served by Josefa Camejo International Airport, with a number of commercial airlines flying there from Caracas and from Cuba and, formerly, from Aruba. Las Piedras also has a sea port.

References 

Cities in Falcón